Achondroplasia in children is the most common form of dwarfism; it accounts for about 70% of all cases of dwarfism. Achondroplasia falls into the category of “disproportionate dwarfism”. It is linked to a mutation in the fibroblast growth factor receptor-3. More than 250,000 people in the world are diagnosed with achondroplasia. Achondroplasia diagnosis occurs somewhere between one in every 10,000 and one in every 30,000 live births.

Some symptoms of achondroplasia are short stature, a long and narrow trunk, shortening of the proximal segments of limbs, large head, mid-face hypoplasia, and joint hyperextension, among others. Achondroplasia is defined by central nervous system defects as well as the prior physical symptoms. Average height for an adult man or woman diagnosed with achondroplasia is about 120 centimeters (47.2 inches), although technically a maximum of 148 centimeters (58.2 inches) is also considered achondroplastic. Achondroplastic people typically have a long trunk and smaller upper legs and upper arms. Those are of normal intelligence and able to lead independent and productive lives.

Presentation
Because achondroplastic children have different genes, their growth cycle should be expected to differ from that of a non-achondroplastic child. It is very typical for an achondroplastic child to snore because of their smaller than average size airways. There is no data that unfailingly states respiratory problems. Even though achondroplastic children have reduced lung volumes, this does not seem to result in respiratory problems.

Children diagnosed with achondroplasia usually have delayed motor milestones, otitis media, and bowing of the lower legs. Achondroplastic infants also need to be watched carefully the first few years of infancy for support problems.  An infant or child’s hearing and sight needs to be monitored through the years. Along with their development of hearing and sight, their posture will not be guaranteed to develop perfectly to support the child.  Achondroplastic children may also encounter speech impairment in their early years. If a child that is diagnosed is falling behind or lacking in any of these areas, they should be taken to a pediatrician for help to restore the children to where they should be. Young children may have health issues that are related to upper-airway obstruction.

Typical for achondroplastic children, as well, is sweating more than is average for children. Achondroplastic children’s diets should be watched very closely because it is easy for children to become obese when they are young. Their diets should be restricted to smaller portions than that of a child who is not diagnosed with achondroplasia. Gastroesophageal reflux is more common in achondroplastic children as well and should be treated and watched very closely if it furthers already heightened respiratory problems. Most infants diagnosed with achondroplasia will develop thoracolumbar kyphosis, which will need to be treated delicately so they can develop good posture with much care. If not watched properly or treated carefully, thoracolumbar kyphosis can help lead to spinal stenosis.

Diagnosis
A child may be diagnosed with achondroplasia as early as the fetal stages of pregnancy. Most cases are first identified as early as 26 weeks in the gestational period. 85% of children born with achondroplasia are born of parents who are average height who are not themselves achondroplastic. However, 75% of all cases are the result of de novo, or entirely new, genetic mutations. If both parents are diagnosed with achondroplasia, however, there is a higher chance of life-threatening problems.

Management
Achondroplastic children require special attention as they grow up and age. The home setting for an achondroplastic child should be modified in a way that is fitting for a child with a growth mutation. Toys should be considered and altered to fit the needs of the child, or size of the child, such as tricycles and backyard playground equipment. Other fixtures in the home should be replaced to attainable heights for the children such as light switches or door knobs. Because achondroplastic children tend to have weaker posture, supporting cushions should be considered in use as well as stools for their feet when they are sitting down.

For an achondroplastic child to develop better, activities such as biking or swimming should be included in their daily schedule. Such activities may help with strength in the limbs and posture and will help to avert the problems of thoracolumbar kyphosis and spinal stenosis. Other activities, like gymnastics or rough sports should be avoided because they will help with the deteriorating of their back support and posture. Achondroplastic children should also be worked with daily on their verbal skills, so as to help them overcome the speech impairments they may likely encounter.

Prevalence
Achondroplastic births are completely sporadic and the chances of having another child who is also achondroplastic is not more likely than for anyone else - having an achondroplastic child is entirely situational. There are specific ways to raise a child diagnosed with achondroplasia that will be beneficial to their growth and aging. Achondroplastic children, to be given better chances, must be raised with greater care than children who are not.

References

Cell surface receptor deficiencies
Growth disorders
Congenital disorders